Fonua is a surname. Notable people with the surname include:

Amini Fonua (born 1989), Tongan swimmer
Mahe Fonua (born 1992), Australian rugby league player
Opeti Fonua (born 1986), Tongan rugby union player
Semisi Fonua (1911–1968), Tongan noble and politician
Sione Fonua (born 1980), Tongan former rugby union player

See also
Addin Fonua-Blake (born 1995), Australian rugby league player
Penisimani Angelo Fonua Siolaa (born 1994), Tongan male weightlifter

Surnames of Tongan origin
Tongan-language surnames